David Toub (born June 1, 1962) is an American football coach who is the assistant head coach and special teams coordinator for the Kansas City Chiefs of the National Football League (NFL).

Playing career

College
Toub played offensive line at Springfield College from 1980 to 1981 and at the University of Texas-El Paso (UTEP) from 1983 to 1984. At UTEP, Toub earned All-WAC selections twice.

Professional
Toub was drafted by the Philadelphia Eagles in the ninth round of the 1985 NFL Draft. He was released before the start of the regular season. Later, Toub attended the Los Angeles Rams training camp in two consecutive years, but was released before the start of the regular season.

Coaching career

College
Toub began his coaching career at the University of Texas-El Paso in 1986. His first year was as a graduate assistant; the next two years he was the strength and conditioning coach.  Toub then spent nine years as the strength and conditioning coach at the University of Missouri; also coaching offensive line from 1989 to 1991 was Andy Reid. Afterwards, Toub coached the defensive line for three years.

Professional

Philadelphia Eagles
In 2001, Toub began his coaching career in the National Football League with the Philadelphia Eagles as the special teams/quality control coach.

Chicago Bears
Toub joined the Chicago Bears coaching staff on January 24, 2004, as the special teams coordinator. On February 27, 2007, Toub signed a three-year extension with the Bears, keeping him under contract through the 2009 season. The Bears' special teams unit was highly successful in 2006; kicker Robbie Gould, return specialist Devin Hester, and gunner Brendon Ayanbadejo were voted to the 2007 Pro Bowl. On April 5, 2007, Toub was voted special teams coach of the year by his peers. His special teams unit was ranked at the top of the league for the 2006 and 2007 seasons. For the last eight years, the Bears special teams have been in the top three, and was ranked third by rankings performed by the Dallas Morning News. In 2008 he was elected to the USA Today All-Joe team.

Kansas City Chiefs
On January 15, 2013, Toub announced that he would leave Chicago and accept a position with the Kansas City Chiefs and reunite with Andy Reid. In 2018, he received the assistant head coach title in addition to his special teams coordinator duties. In 2019, Toub won his first Super Bowl when the Chiefs defeated the San Francisco 49ers 31-20 in Super Bowl LIV. In 2022, Toub won his second Super Bowl when the Chiefs defeated the Philadelphia Eagles 38-35 in Super Bowl LVII.

Personal life
Toub is married with a son and daughter. His son, Shane, is the defensive quality control coach for the Chicago Bears and a former football player at the University of Dayton.

References

Living people
1962 births
American strength and conditioning coaches
Chicago Bears coaches
Kansas City Chiefs coaches
Philadelphia Eagles players
People from Ossining, New York
UTEP Miners football players